Johndale C. Solem (born 1941) is an American theoretical physicist and Fellow of Los Alamos National Laboratory. Solem has authored or co-authored over 185 technical papers in many different scientific fields. He is known for his work on avoiding comet or asteroid collisions with Earth and on interstellar spacecraft propulsion.

Education and career 

At Yale University, Johndale C. Solem earned his B.S. cum laude in Physics in 1963 and his Ph.D. in Physics in 1968.  His Ph.D. thesis work under Glen A. Rebka, Jr. was on dynamic nuclear polarization in deuterium hydride.  He then joined the Theoretical Division of Los Alamos Scientific Laboratory (subsequently known as Los Alamos National Laboratory) in New Mexico (1969-2000).

Concurrently with his research, Solem held several management positions (1971-1988).  Some of his appointments were: Group Leader of Thermonuclear Weapons Physics, Group Leader of Neutron Physics, Group Leader of High-Energy-Density Physics, Deputy Division Leader of Physics, and Associate Division Leader of Theory.

Shortly after the breakup of the Soviet Union, Solem led a U.S./Russia joint collaboration of scientists in an effort to obtain good science and to improve US/Russia relations.

Solem served on the U. S. Air Force Scientific Advisory Board (1971-1978) and several DoD and DOE committees advising on science policy.  He was Los Alamos' representative to the national missile Site Defense Systems Planning Study.  He served on the Los Alamos Weapons Program Review Committee and high-level committees setting the direction of nuclear weapons development (1971-1988).  Solem headed the Los Alamos Postdoctoral Research Program (1972-1978) and authored the program's charter, which is still in effect.

While a consultant to the RAND Corporation in Santa Monica, CA (1987-2005), he conducted research on antimatter technology and microrobotics, as well as national security issues.  As a consultant to the University of Illinois at Chicago (1987-1988), his research involved x-ray lasers and microholography.

Scientific contributions 

Solem's research activities have involved experimental, computational, and theoretical physics and mathematics, as well as other areas of science, including magnetism; particle and radiation transport; plasma physics; nuclear physics; nuclear explosive theory; equations-of-state; artificial intelligence and robotics; computational science; x-ray microholography; antiproton science and technology; mathematical physics; astrophysics; exotic methods of spacecraft propulsion; the foundations of quantum mechanics; and laser theory, particularly as it applies to conceptual designs for the gamma-ray laser.

Comets and asteroids

Solem's work on the interception and deflection of comets and asteroids on collision course with Earth (1993a, 2000) also led to a theory of the origin of the shape of rubble-pile asteroids.  His analytic theory of the breakup of comets by planetary tidal forces resulted in his calculation of the diameter and density of the parent comet of Shoemaker-Levy 9 as it was before breaking up in the tidal field of Jupiter in 1994 (1994a).

Nuclear plasma pulse propulsion for interplanetary space travel

Solem's research on interplanetary travel culminated in his MEDUSA concept, a nuclear explosive propelled spacecraft for interplanetary space travel (1994b).  Gregory Matloff said this was "a surprising [propulsion] concept which might greatly reduce spacecraft mass."  The concept inspired research and elaboration by the aerospace community.

At the behest of NASA's Breakthrough Propulsion Physics Project, Solem investigated whether a nuclear external pulsed plasma propelled (EPPP) interstellar probe could reach Alpha Centauri in 40 years, the average length of a scientist's career.  No scheme could be found, even involving elaborate staging, that could accelerate such a vehicle much beyond 1% the speed of light.

Quantum mechanics

Solem discovered a strange polarization of the hydrogen atom that, contrary to intuition, drove electron orbits perpendicular to an applied electric field (1987).

He elucidated the interpretation of geometric phase in quantum mechanics by showing the invalidity of superposition of quantal states, the distinction between rays and vectors in projective Hilbert space, and the meaning of resultant singularities (1993b). Using the symmetry of the Kepler Orbital Problem in operator formalism for both classical and quantum mechanics, Solem predicted a previously unknown elastic scattering process that will rotate the linear polarization of the scattered photon by ½ (1997a).

Continuum mechanics

Solem examined the fundamental nature of foams under compression and showed a general hyperbolic stress-strain relation (1999).

Physical and chemical phenomena at extremely high magnetic fields

Solem provided leadership for a series of pioneering experiments, known as the Dirac Project, that used capacitor banks and Russian designed and built high-explosive-driven flux compression devices to investigate physical and chemical phenomena at extremely high magnetic fields and pressures (1997b).  These experiments were an international collaboration of scientists from Russia, Germany, Japan, Australia, Belgium, several American universities, and Los Alamos National Laboratory.

Gamma-ray lasers

Solem contributed to many innovations in  gamma-ray laser (graser) research, publishing more than a dozen papers over a period of twenty years.

Laser-driven shock waves

Solem and colleagues performed the first laser-driven experiments on shock-wave structure (1977, 1978) and the first impedance-match experiments.

Advanced lasers of extremely short wave lengths

While on sabbatical at the University of Illinois at Chicago (1987-1988), Solem engaged in research with academic colleagues to probe the limits starting with a large krypton-fluoride excimer laser at the University's laser laboratory, which would produce short intense pulses of 248-nm radiation.  He and his colleagues investigated many-electron motions in multiphoton ionization and excitation, fifth-harmonic production in neon and argon, strong-field processes in the ultraviolet, generation of very short wavelengths in BaF2, which produced x-rays 9-13 Å and the kinetic energy distributions of ionic fragments produced by subpicosecond multiphoton ionization of N2 (1988a, 1989b, 1991a).

X-ray microholography

Solem wrote a paper on the use of x-ray microholography to image biological specimens (1982).  As a result, this early work, research in pursuit of x-ray holography has continued at University of California at Berkeley, University of Illinois, Lawrence Livermore National Laboratory, industrial firms, and in France and Germany. Solem observed that by using intense, pulsed coherent x-ray sources, it is possible to obtain magnified three-dimensional images of elementary biological structures in the living state (1996a).

Theory of high-intensity laser-beam self-channeling

While at the University of Illinois at Chicago, Solem and colleagues developed an analytic theory of charge-displacement self-channeling as a mechanism to extend atomic lasers to higher quantum energy and then broadened this theory to the development of KeV-range laboratory x-ray lasers (1989c, 1994d).

Robotics

Solem created a high-level programming language for controlling personal robots.  In addition to initiating a laboratory program in artificial intelligence and robotics, Solem did "pioneering" calculations on the motility of microrobots (1994e).  He showed unique mechanisms for self-assembly of motile microrobots based on Platonic solids, in particular the dodecahedron, which can assemble into a helix appropriate for propulsion at high-Reynolds number (2002).  He described several microrobots for military applications (1996b).

Advanced computers

In addition to organizing and leading the development of several large-scale physics application computer codes, Solem developed a concept for massively parallel supercomputer architecture specialized for Monte Carlo solution of integro-differential equations (1985a, 1985b).

National defense policy

Solem developed ideas regarding nuclear deterrence for national defense policy (1974, 1981b).

Nuclear technology research and pure nuclear fusion

Solem contributed ideas of using beta-particle spectroscopy to measure mix processes in National Ignition Facility (NIF) microcapsules (2006).

Universal origin of life

Solem worked on a universal, astrophysically-based theory of the origin of life by natural processes arising from non-living matter starting with the minimum possible information, or the minimum possible departure from thermodynamic equilibrium, along with thermodynamically free energy.  He developed underlying physical criteria for the minimum size necessary for molecules in order to become self-replicating (2003a).

Antimatter science and technology

Solem worked out techniques to use very small quantities of antiprotons stored in a Penning trap, or similar charged-particle storage device, to perform Lilliputian experiments in high energy density physics, including opacity and equation-of-state measurements (1988b, 1990).

He worked on spacecraft propulsion using antimatter.  He developed the re-entrant- scheme for the efficient use of antiproton annihilation energy (1991b), while consulting for the RAND Corporation.

Mathematics

Solem collaborated on the development of pseudo characteristic functions of convex polyhedra, a result providing rapid regional particle location in Monte Carlo calculations (2003b).

Cited papers 
  
  
  
  
  
 
  
 
  
 
 
  
 
 
  
 
  
 
 
  Solem, J. C. (1991b) "Prospects for efficient use of annihilation energy".  Fusion Technology 20: 1040-1045.  (see also Program and Abstracts for ICENES '91 Sixth International Conference on Emerging Nuclear Energy Systems, June 16–21, 1991, Monterey, CA).

Honors and awards 
 Fellow of Los Alamos National Laboratory (1996)
 Los Alamos Fellows Award for Dedicated Services as Coordinator of the Fellows (1999-2000)
 Outstanding Mentor Award, Los Alamos National Laboratory (2002)
 Distinguished Performance Award, Los Alamos National Laboratory (1991) 
 Sigma Xi (1963)

Patents held 
 U.S. Patent No. 4,955,974.  September 11, 1990.  Rhodes, C. K.; Boyer, K.; Solem, J. C.; Haddad, W. S.  "Apparatus for generating x-ray holograms".
 U.S. Patent No. 5,214,581.  May 25, 1993.  Rhodes, C. K.; Boyer, K.; Solem, J. C.; Haddad, W. S.  "Method for object reconstruction from x-ray holograms".

References

See also 
Project Orion (nuclear propulsion)

Living people
1941 births
Los Alamos National Laboratory personnel
Yale University alumni
Theoretical physicists
21st-century American physicists